Aporodes dentifascialis is a moth of the family Crambidae. It was described by Hugo Theodor Christoph in 1887 and is found in Azerbaijan.

External links

Moths described in 1887
Odontiini
Moths of Asia